Irene Ogus is a female former international table tennis player from England.

Table tennis career
She won a bronze medal at the 1965 World Table Tennis Championships in the Corbillon Cup (women's team event) with Diane Rowe, Lesley Bell and Mary Shannon.

She also won a gold medal in the team event at the 1964 European Table Tennis Championships.

At the 1969 Maccabiah Games in Israel, she won a silver medal in singles, and with Leah Neuberger won a gold medal in doubles, and with Jeff Ingber won a gold medal in mixed doubles.

See also
 List of England players at the World Team Table Tennis Championships

References

English female table tennis players
1944 births
Living people
Competitors at the 1969 Maccabiah Games
Maccabiah Games gold medalists
Maccabiah Games silver medalists
Maccabiah Games medalists in table tennis
Jewish table tennis players
World Table Tennis Championships medalists